Sherbet is the seventh studio album by Australian band, Sherbet released in August 1978. The album peaked at number 6 on the Kent Music Report. 

The album was titled Highway 1 by Highway in North America.

Track listing

Personnel 
 Bass, vocals – Tony Mitchell
 Drums – Alan Sandow
 Guitar, vocals – Harvey James
 Keyboards, vocals – Garth Porter
 Lead vocals – Daryl Braithwaite

Charts

Release history

References 

Sherbet (band) albums
1978 albums
Festival Records albums
Infinity Records albums